Danny Nicklas (born ) is an English rugby league footballer who plays for the Hunslet in Betfred League 1, as a .

He used to play for the York City Knights, and he has also played in the Kingstone Press League 1 for the Gloucestershire All Golds.

References

External links
Profile at thunderrugby.co.uk
Hull profile
Profile at thunderrugby.com

1991 births
Living people
Doncaster R.L.F.C. players
English rugby league players
Gloucestershire All Golds players
Hull F.C. players
Hunslet R.L.F.C. players
Newcastle Thunder players
Rugby league five-eighths
Rugby league players from Kingston upon Hull
York City Knights players